A Peruvian passport is a travel document issued to citizens of Peru with the purpose of identification and to travel outside the country. It is issued by the Superintendencia Nacional de Migraciones, the Peruvian immigration and naturalization authority, which is part of the Ministry of the Interior. The Peruvian passport has the benefit of "visa free" status for member nations of the Andean Community and Mercosur, as well as several Central American nations.

Alternatively, a document called an Andean Migration Card can be used at any Andean airport, with which Peruvian citizens can travel freely throughout the territory of the Andean Community.

Types
 Ordinary passport - Issued for ordinary travel, such as vacations and business trips
 Special passport - Issued to individuals representing the Peruvian government on official business
 Diplomatic passport - Issued to Peruvian diplomats, top ranking government officials and diplomatic couriers

Other types of passports established by international agreements also exist. A non-biometric passport, known as a mechanized passport, was issued until July 7, 2016.

Physical appearance
Peruvian passports are burgundy, with the coat of arms of Peru emblazoned on the front cover. The words "COMUNIDAD ANDINA" and "REPÚBLICA DEL PERÚ" are inscribed above the coat of arms. Below the coat of arms, the words "PASAPORTE" and "PASSPORT" are visible. Since 2016 they are biometric passports.

Visa requirements 

As of May 2018, Peruvian citizens have visa-free or visa on arrival access to 135 countries and territories, ranking the Peruvian passport 8th in the American continent and 35th in terms of world travel freedom according to the Henley Passport Index.

Application
To apply for a Peruvian passport, one needs a national ID (DNI) and the proof of the payment for the passport fee. Then with both documents, one must enter the Migraciones website to book an appointment (normally granted the same day) which also requires both documents. No forms need be filled. The passport is issued the day of the appointment.

Peruvians living abroad can apply at a Peruvian consulate. Issuance abroad takes about three weeks.

Andean Migration Card
An Andean Migration Card (TAM) is a migration document issued and valid in the Andean Community's member states: Bolivia, Colombia, Ecuador and Peru. The document can be presented to migration authorities instead of a passport for travel between these countries.

Gallery

References

External links
 Peruvian immigration and naturalization authority 
 Peruvian Ministry of Foreign Affairs

Peru
Government of Peru